The 2005 Men's European Volleyball League was the second edition of the European Volleyball League, organised by Europe's governing volleyball body, the CEV. The final Four was held in Kazan, Russia from 23 to 24 July 2005.

Competing nations

Squads

League round

Pool 1

|}

Pool 2

|}

Final four

Semi-finals

3rd place match

Final

Final standing

Awards

Most Valuable Player
  Pavel Abramov
Best Scorer
  Mikko Oivanen
Best Spiker
  Mikko Oivanen
Best Blocker
  José Luis Moltó
Best Server
  Taras Khtey
Best Setter
  Simo-Pekka Olli
Best Libero
  Ali Peçen

References
 Official website

European Volleyball League
E
V
V
Volleyball
Volleyball